The Norwegian Union of Meat Industry Workers (NKIF) was a trade union representing workers in abattoirs and butchers in Norway.

The union was founded in 1907 and it affiliated to the Norwegian Confederation of Trade Unions.  By 1924, it had 524 members.  In 1927, Lars Evensen became leader of the union, and its membership grew sharply.

By 1963, the union had 4,024 members.  In 1970, it merged into the Norwegian Union of Food, Beverage and Allied Workers.

Presidents
1927: Lars Evensen
1934: Henrik Henriksen
1945: Helmer Karlsson
c.1960: Henning Dahl

References

Meat industry trade unions
Trade unions established in 1907
Trade unions disestablished in 1970
Trade unions in Norway